The Casio G'zOne Commando is a smartphone which is ruggedized and runs the Android operating system. It is made by NEC Casio Mobile Communications, a joint venture of three Japanese electronics makers: NEC, Casio and Hitachi. It was first released by Verizon in the United States on 28 April 2011.

Its main selling feature is that it is ruggedized to military standard MIL-STD-810G. , it is the first retail-available smartphone so certified. Thus, it is stronger and more durable than normal consumer electronics, similar in concept to the Motorola DEFY, but certified tougher. The phone should be able to handle drops, spills and dirt that accompany physically demanding activities such as those in harsh work environments or outdoors. At one publication, technicians tested this phone and more recently, the updated model, G'zOne Commando 4G LTE. They found both models "rugged"; and describe no ill effects after randomly dropping G'zOne Commando 4G LTE, and submerging it under water for half an hour.

The phone was released with the Android 2.2.1 Froyo operating system, but an upgrade to Android 2.3.3 GIngerbread is available.

Some reviewers have criticized the phone's styling and aesthetics as unattractive.

See also
 Casio
 Samsung Rugby Smart

References

External links
 

Does not appear to be a website owned by Casio
Smartphones
Android (operating system) devices
Verizon Wireless
Mobile phones introduced in 2011